African Biodiversity & Conservation, formerly known as Bothalia is a South African peer-reviewed open access scientific journal covering the fields of botany, zoology and biodiversity, produced by the South African National Biodiversity Institute. According to the Journal Citation Reports, the journal has a 2017 impact factor of 0.52.

Description 
The journal is produced yearly, but articles are published on-line continually. When the journal was renamed in 2014, as well as broadening the scope it was made open access and its contents made freely available under the Creative Commons Attribution 4.0 International (CC BY 4.0) license. The entire contents back to the first issue are available on the journal's website.

History
The journal was established in 1921, producing its first issue in 1922, as an in house journal of South Africa's National Botanical Institute. The journal was formally known by the name Bothalia alone, from 1922 to 2014 when the title was expanded to better reflect the role of the South African National Biodiversity Institute.

In 2004 the National Botanical Institute was absorbed into a broader configuration, the South African National Biodiversity Institute, by the National Environmental Management: Biodiversity Act. The journal was named after the first Prime Minister of South Africa Louis Botha who was Minister of Agriculture from 1910 to 1913.

References

Bibliography

Botany journals
Biodiversity
Hijacked journals